Al-Mundhir I ibn Yahya al-Tujibi or Mundhir I was the first head of the Banu Tujib to rule the city of Zaragoza independent of control by the Caliphate of Córdoba, founding the Taifa of Zaragoza. He ruled from 1018 to 1022.

References
 List of Muslim rulers

Emirs of Zaragoza
11th-century rulers in Al-Andalus
11th-century Arabs